Riccardo Giacconi (October 6, 1931 – December 9, 2018) was an Italian-American Nobel Prize-winning astrophysicist who laid down the foundations of X-ray astronomy.  He was a professor at the Johns Hopkins University.

Biography 
Born in Genoa, Italy, Giacconi received his Laurea from the Physics Department of University of Milan before moving to the US to pursue a career in astrophysics research. In 1956, his Fulbright Fellowship led him to  go to the United States to collaborate with physics professor R. W. Thompson at Indiana University.

Since cosmic X-ray radiation is absorbed by the Earth's atmosphere, space-based telescopes are needed for X-ray astronomy.  Applying himself to this problem, Giacconi worked on the instrumentation for X-ray astronomy; from rocket-borne detectors in the late 1950s and early 1960s, to Uhuru, the first orbiting X-ray astronomy satellite, in the 1970s.  Giacconi's pioneering research continued in 1978 with the Einstein Observatory, the first fully imaging X-ray telescope put into space, and later with the Chandra X-ray Observatory, which was launched in 1999 and is still in operation. Giacconi also applied his expertise to other fields of astronomy, becoming the first permanent director (1981-1993) of the Space Telescope Science Institute (the science operations center for the Hubble Space Telescope), followed by Director General of the European Southern Observatory (ESO) from 1993 to 1999, overseeing the construction of the Very Large Telescope, then President of Associated Universities, Inc. (1999-2004) managing the early years of the ALMA array.

Giacconi was awarded a share of the Nobel Prize in Physics in 2002 "for pioneering contributions to astrophysics, which have led to the discovery of cosmic X-ray sources". The other shares of the Prize in that year were awarded to Masatoshi Koshiba and Raymond Davis, Jr. for neutrino astronomy.

Giacconi held the positions of professor of physics and astronomy (1982–1997) and research professor (from 1998 to his death in 2018) at Johns Hopkins University, and was a university professor.  During the 2000s he was principal investigator for the major Chandra Deep Field-South project with NASA's Chandra X-ray Observatory. Giacconi died on December 9, 2018.

Honors and awards 
 Helen B. Warner Prize for Astronomy (1966)
Member of the National Academy of Sciences (1971)
Member of the American Academy of Arts and Sciences (1971)
 Bruce Medal (1981)
 Henry Norris Russell Lectureship (1981)
 Heineman Prize (1981)
 Gold Medal of the Royal Astronomical Society (1982)
 Wolf Prize in Physics (1987)
Member of the American Philosophical Society (2001)
 Nobel Prize in Physics (2002)
 National Medal of Science (2003)
 Asteroid 3371 Giacconi

References

Further reading

External links 
  including the Nobel Lecture December 8, 2002 The Dawn of X-Ray Astronomy

1931 births
2018 deaths
Scientists from Genoa
Members of the United States National Academy of Sciences
20th-century American astronomers
Italian emigrants to the United States
Johns Hopkins University faculty
National Medal of Science laureates
Nobel laureates in Physics
Italian Nobel laureates
American Nobel laureates
Fellows of the American Physical Society
Wolf Prize in Physics laureates
Recipients of the Gold Medal of the Royal Astronomical Society
Winners of the Dannie Heineman Prize for Astrophysics
University of Milan alumni
20th-century Italian astronomers
21st-century American astronomers
Members of the American Philosophical Society
Fulbright alumni